Jarle Wee (born 2 February 1972) was a Norwegian football striker.

In his early career he played for SK Haugar. The team played in the second highest league in Norway, but performed badly in the 1992 season, conceding 97 goals. When the club FK Haugesund was formed through a merger, Wee joined that team. In the 1994 league opener he scored 4 goals against Os TF. When the club won promotion to the Norwegian Premier League after the 1996 season, Wee was the club's all-time top goalscorer. In 2001, he signed up with Motala AIF. When he came back from Sweden the next year, he signed up with SK Vard Haugesund and retired in 2012.

References

1972 births
Living people
Norwegian footballers
FK Haugesund players
SK Vard Haugesund players
Norwegian expatriate footballers
Expatriate footballers in Sweden
Norwegian expatriate sportspeople in Sweden

Association football forwards